Steven Deon Hunter (born October 31, 1981) is American former professional basketball player. He is listed as a center. He most recently played for Dinamo Sassari.

High school and college career
Hunter played basketball at Proviso East High School, which has produced other NBA players such as Sherell Ford, Michael Finley, Jim Brewer, Doc Rivers, Dee Brown, Donnie Boyce, Reggie Jordan,  Shannon Brown, Sterling Brown, and Jevon Carter. Hunter then played two years at DePaul University in Chicago, before declaring himself eligible for the 2001 NBA draft.

Professional career
As a rookie, Hunter set a then-career high points total with 17 points on December 5, 2001 in a 102–74 win over the Chicago Bulls.

In 2002 during training camp with the Magic he suffered an anterior cruciate ligament injury and missed 49 games of the 2002–2003 NBA season.

On April 24, 2005, then on the Phoenix Suns, Hunter scored a postseason career high 16 points, alongside grabbing 5 rebounds, in a 114–103 victory over the Memphis Grizzlies. Hunter and the Suns would ultimately make it to the Western Conference Finals before losing to the Spurs.

In the 2005 offseason, he signed with the 76ers as a free agent. They traded him to the New Orleans Hornets on February 1, 2006 in exchange for two second-round draft picks in 2006 and 2007. On February 10, Philadelphia president Billy King announced that the Hornets rescinded the deal.

On September 10, 2007, Hunter was traded with Bobby Jones by the 76ers to the Denver Nuggets for Reggie Evans and the draft rights to Ricky Sanchez.

On August 7, 2009, the Nuggets traded Hunter and a lottery-protected 2010 first-round draft pick to the Memphis Grizzlies for a future second-round pick.

Hunter's final NBA game was played on February 6, 2010 in a 102–109 loss to the Minnesota Timberwolves where he recorded 2 points and 1 rebound in 5 minutes of play.

In October 2011 he signed with Dinamo Sassari in Italy.

In 2014, Hunter would become the Phoenix Suns' ambassador throughout the community in Arizona.

NBA career statistics

Regular season

|-
| align="left" | 
| align="left" | Orlando
| 53 || 21 || 9.7 || .456 || .000 || .585 || 1.8 || .1 || .1 || .8 || 3.6
|-
| align="left" | 
| align="left" | Orlando
| 33 || 5 || 13.5 || .544 || .000 || .409 || 2.8 || .2 || .3 || 1.1 || 3.9
|-
| align="left" | 
| align="left" | Orlando
| 59 || 23 || 13.4 || .529 || .000 || .333 || 2.9 || .2 || .1 || 1.2 || 3.2
|-
| align="left" | 
| align="left" | Phoenix
| 76 || 3 || 13.8 || .614 || .000 || .479 || 3.0 || .2 || .1 || 1.3 || 4.6
|-
| align="left" | 
| align="left" | Philadelphia
| 69 || 35 || 19.0 || .601 || .000 || .514 || 3.9 || .2 || .2 || 1.1 || 6.1
|-
| align="left" | 
| align="left" | Philadelphia
| 70 || 41 || 22.9 || .577 || .000 || .490 || 4.8 || .4 || .2 || 1.1 || 6.4
|-
| align="left" | 
| align="left" | Denver
| 19 || 2 || 6.3 || .536 || .000 || .450 || 1.5 || .0 || .0 || .3 || 2.1
|-
| align="left" | 
| align="left" | Memphis
| 21 || 0 || 7.5 || .395 || .000 || .528 || 2.0 || .0 || .0 || .5 || 2.5
|- class="sortbottom"
| style="text-align:center;" colspan="2"| Career
| 400 || 130 || 15.0 || .560 || .000 || .485 || 3.2 || .2 || .1 || 1.1 || 4.5

Playoffs

|-
| align="left" | 2003
| align="left" | Orlando
| 7 || 0 || 5.7 || .300 || .000 || .000 || .4 || .1 || .0 || .4 || .9
|-
| align="left" | 2005
| align="left" | Phoenix
| 15 || 0 || 14.2 || .558 || .000 || .600 || 2.5 || .2 || .1 || 1.2 || 4.0
|-
| align="left" | 2008
| align="left" | Denver
| 2 || 0 || 2.5 || .000 || .000 || .000 || 1.0 || .0 || .0 || .0 || .0
|- class="sortbottom"
| style="text-align:center;" colspan="2"| Career
| 24 || 0 || 10.8 || .500 || .000 || .522 || 1.8 || .2 || .0 || .9 || 2.8

Notes

External links
NBA.com Profile

1981 births
Living people
African-American basketball players
American expatriate basketball people in Italy
American men's basketball players
Basketball players from Chicago
Centers (basketball)
Denver Nuggets players
DePaul Blue Demons men's basketball players
Dinamo Sassari players
Memphis Grizzlies players
Orlando Magic draft picks
Orlando Magic players
Philadelphia 76ers players
Phoenix Suns players
Power forwards (basketball)
21st-century African-American sportspeople
20th-century African-American people